Midget tossing may refer to:

Midget Tossing, an album
Dwarf tossing, a pub game